Rocky is a Swedish autobiographical comic strip created by Martin Kellerman, focusing on an anthropomorphic dog, Rocky, and his friends in their everyday life in Stockholm.

Overview 
Rocky is based on Kellerman's own life. According to Kellerman, "My friends are just such perfect cartoon characters. A lot of times they say things and all I have to do is write it down. Their personalities match and complement each other so well, it's impossible not to write it down. If I wait a while, even the upsetting stuff they can still laugh about."

Some of the humor draws from hip hop culture, and the dialogue sometimes incorporates English phrases. Kellerman states that "when a Swede says something like Jay-Z would say, that's automatically funny. It's still white here, but in Sweden, it's funnier. Most of my friends have grown up on hip-hop, but it's like a joke—we're so not gangsta."

The comic has been translated to Norwegian, Danish, Finnish, Serbian, English, Spanish, and French, either as a running strip or collected in book form.

History 
Kellerman created Rocky after his girlfriend broke up with him and he was fired from his job as a cartoonist for a pornographic magazine. He decided to draw a comic strip about his current situation to entertain himself and his friends, and did not initially take it seriously. The strip was picked up by the free newspaper Metro, and moved from publication to publication because multiple newspapers canceled the strip in response to reader complaints over its profanity and sexual content.

The strips have been collected in several books, first one published in 1999. Fantagraphics Books published two volumes of the strip, translated into English, in 2005 and 2008. Kellerman also publishes Rocky as a magazine, featuring comic strips and other material, including interviews with hip hop artists such as 50 Cent, M.I.A. and The Game drawn in comic form. Rocky has also been performed as a touring play in Sweden in 2000. 13 episodes of a 3D computer-animated TV series were produced, and have been released on DVD.

References

External links 

  Rights: Strand Comics

Swedish comic strips
1998 comics debuts
Swedish comics characters
Autobiographical comics
Fantagraphics titles
Fictional cartoonists
Comics characters introduced in 1998
Mascots introduced in 1998
Anthropomorphic dogs
Fictional Swedish people
Humor comics
Slice of life comics
Underground comix
1998 establishments in Sweden
Comics about animals
Comics about dogs
Animated characters
Comics magazines published in Sweden
Magazine mascots
Comics adapted into animated series
Male characters in comics
Male characters in advertising